Boral Limited is Australia's largest building and construction materials supplier, with market-leading positions in quarries, cement, concrete and asphalt. Boral is actively pursuing a decarbonisation strategy by recycling of demolition materials, converting landfill and waste to energy and transitioning to 100 percent renewable electricity. With revenue for total operations of A$2.96 billion (2022), Boral has about 9,000 employees and contractors working across 356 operating and distribution sites. Its headquarters are located in Sydney, Australia.

History
Boral was founded by David Craig on 4 March 1946 as Bitumen and Oil Refineries (Australia) Limited with Caltex having a 40% shareholding. In March 1947, it opened Matraville Refinery, Australia's first bitumen and oil refinery. In 1963, the company was renamed Boral Limited having been commonly referred to by its acronym since it commenced trading. In 1964, it purchased the Gas Supply Company with 28 coal gas companies in New South Wales, Queensland and Victoria. In 1968 Boral sold a 50% stake in its refining business to Total, before selling it the remainder in January 1972. In 1969, it entered the building materials industry through a number of acquisitions.

In 1979, Boral entered the United States market, purchasing a 55% shareholding in California Tile from Amalco. In February 1987 Boral purchased cement manufacturer Blue Circle Southern Cement from BHP and Blue Circle Industries. In 1990, Midland Brick was purchased.

In January 2000, Boral sold its tyre business to Bridgestone. In February 2000, Boral's energy assets were spun off into a separate listed entity, Origin Energy.

In December 2020, Boral sold Midland Brick to the Buckeridge Group of Companies. This followed Boral selling its bricks business on Australia's east coast in 2016.

In April 2021, Boral divested its plasterboard business, completing the process with the sale of its 50 per cent interest in the USG Boral joint venture to Knauf group for US$1.015 billion. In May 2021, Seven Group Holdings launched a takeover bid. In June 2021, Boral sold its United States operations to Westlake Chemical. In July 2021, Seven gained control of Boral with a 70% shareholding.

References

External links
Boral Corporate
Boral Australia
Contact Boral

Building materials companies of Australia
Cement companies of Australia
Manufacturing companies based in Sydney
Companies listed on the Australian Securities Exchange
Multinational companies headquartered in Australia
Manufacturing companies established in 1946
Australian companies established in 1946
Seven Network